Heteroglenea fissilis is a species of beetle in the family Cerambycidae. It was described by Stephan von Breuning in 1953. It is known from Myanmar, India, Bangladesh, Laos, China, and Thailand. It feeds on Dialium cochinchinense.

References

Saperdini
Beetles described in 1953